William J. Morgan (December 13, 1883 – October 1983) was an American lawyer.  He was the 24th Attorney General of Wisconsin.

Biography

Born in Charlesburg, Wisconsin, Morgan graduated from University of Wisconsin–Madison. He then received his law degree from University of Michigan Law School. He initially worked as a lawyer in the office of Nathan Glicksman, but in 1910 started his own practice in Milwaukee.  In 1918, he started a partnership with Guy D. Goff and Frank M. Hoyt.  He announced his candidacy for the Republican nomination for state Attorney General on August 20, 1920, and won the Republican primary held on September 7, defeating Adolph Kanneberg, who had been the preferred candidate of Senator Robert M. La Follette.  He went on to win the general election and served as Attorney General of Wisconsin from 1921 to 1923.  He was not a candidate for re-nomination in 1922. He died in October 1983.

Notes

1883 births
1983 deaths
People from Brothertown, Wisconsin
University of Wisconsin–Madison alumni
University of Michigan Law School alumni
Wisconsin Republicans
Wisconsin Attorneys General
20th-century American politicians